Anbulla Ghilli is a 2022 Indian Tamil-language film produced by Sreenidhi Sagar & E Mala and the second film of Srinath Ramalingam. The film had its direct television premiere on Colors Tamil on February 6, 2022.

Plot 
Ghilli, the dog, is an ardent fan of Thalapathy Vijay and the narrator. Anbulla Ghilli is a slice-of-life film with elements of romance and a message that is subtly put.

Cast 

Amigo (dog) as Ghilli
Soori as Ghilli (voice)
Maithreya Rajasekar as Ramu
Dushara Vijayan as Anvitha
Mime Gopi as Sundaram
Chandini Tamilarasan as Bhargavi
VJ Ashiq Hussain 
Nanjil Vijayan
Ilavarasu as Bhargavi's father
Mayilsamy
Poo Ram
Indhumathi as Bhargavi's mother
Sriranjini
Baby Kirthika

Production 
In April 2019, Srinath Ramalingam, who earlier directed Unakenna Venum Sollu announced he would be making a film with a dog in lead role. The film's title was revealed to be Anbulla Ghilli with Arrol Corelli and Balasubramaniam handling music and cinematography respectively. Soori dubbed for the dog character in the film.

Soundtrack

Soundtrack was composed by Arrol Corelli. Andrea Jeremiah and Yuvan Shankar Raja have crooned a song.

Reception
The theatrical released of the film was delayed for months due to the COVID-19 pandemic, the makers decided to premiere the film directly on Colors Tamil channel on February 6, 2022.

Cinema Express wrote "The already terrible writing is further pulled down by some pathetic performances".

References

External links 

2022 films
2020s Tamil-language films
Films about dogs
Indian television films
2022 television films